Rostislav Erastovich Khugayev ( – Xugatê Érastê fêrt Roštik, born 17 December 1951) was the Prime Minister of South Ossetia from 26 April 2012 to 20 January 2014.

Khugayev was born in Mirtgadzhin in Dzau district in the South Ossetian Autonomous Oblast.

Cabinet

Sources:

References

1951 births
Living people
Prime Ministers of South Ossetia